Robin of Locksley is a 1996 television movie directed by Michael Kennedy. It stars Devon Sawa, Joshua Jackson and Sarah Chalke.

Plot
Robin McAllister (Devon Sawa) and his family win the lottery and they end up moving from Kansas City to Seattle where Robin attends Locksley Academy, a wealthy private school. While there Robin comes up with a plan to help one of his friends who was hurt and needs money for an operation by robbing from John Prince Sr., the head of a very wealthy corporation. Robin becomes friends with a couple of misfits at school named Will Scarlett (Billy O'Sullivan) and Little John (Tyler Labine) and also falls for a girl named Marian (Sarah Chalke) who helps train the horses that Robin's family has. While helping out his friends Robin becomes an enemy of John Prince Jr. (Joshua Jackson), the big shot rich kid at school and his friends Warner and Gibson who are also the sons of rich parents. Then Robin goes to join the archery team but is not allowed to because of John Prince Jr. so he starts his own team and his 2 friends join and learn from Robin. McAllister has to outsmart FBI agent Walter Nottingham and help take down the richest kids in the school during the rest of the movie.

Cast
 Devon Sawa as Robin McAllister
 Sarah Chalke as Marion Fitzwater
 Joshua Jackson as John Prince, Jr.

Reception
Robin of Locksley was nominated for two awards. One Directors Guild of America Award for "Outstanding Directorial Achievement in Children's Programs" and one Leo Awards for "Best Overall Sound – Feature Film" for William Butler.

References

External links
 

1996 television films
1996 films
American television films
Canadian television films
English-language Canadian films
Films set in Seattle
Films shot in Vancouver
Robin Hood in television
Showtime (TV network) films
Films directed by Michael Kennedy (director)
1990s English-language films
1990s Canadian films